The Uspallata Pass, Bermejo Pass or Cumbre Pass, is an Andean pass which provides a route between the wine-growing region around the Argentine city of Mendoza, the Chilean city Los Andes and Santiago, the Chilean capital situated in the central Chilean valley.

Overview
The pass has been used since colonial times as the most direct link between the Pacific seaport of Valparaiso and the Atlantic port of Buenos Aires, avoiding the 11-day,  journey by sea, via Cape Horn, between the two ports.  In 1817 it was used by the Army of the Andes to cross the Andes, in the campaign to free Chile from the Spanish Empire.

A railroad tunnel built by the now defunct Transandine Railway (1910–1982) runs underneath. The Pan-American Highway runs through the nearby Cristo Redentor Tunnel (in Spanish: Paso Internacional Cristo Redentor) and a monument, Christ the Redeemer of the Andes ("Cristo Redentor de los Andes" in Spanish) is located at the pass.

See also

 Paso Libertadores

External links

Argentina–Chile border crossings
Landforms of Mendoza Province
Landforms of Valparaíso Region
Mountain passes of the Andes
Mountain passes of Argentina
Mountain passes of Chile
Principal Cordillera